Arshak Petrosyan may refer to:

 Arshak Petrosian (born 1953), Armenian chess player and coach
 Arshak Petrosyan (archer) (born 1991), Armenian recurve archer